Roba Gari (Amharic: ሮባ ጋር; born 12 April 1982) is an Ethiopian runner, who specializes in the 3000 metres steeplechase.

He finished tenth at the 2007 World Championships, in his major international debut.

His personal best time is 8:06.16 minutes, achieved at the IAAF Diamond League in May 2012 in Doha.

Competition record

External links

1982 births
Living people
Ethiopian male middle-distance runners
Olympic athletes of Ethiopia
Athletes (track and field) at the 2008 Summer Olympics
Athletes (track and field) at the 2012 Summer Olympics
Ethiopian male steeplechase runners
African Games silver medalists for Ethiopia
African Games medalists in athletics (track and field)
Athletes (track and field) at the 2007 All-Africa Games
Athletes (track and field) at the 2011 All-Africa Games
20th-century Ethiopian people
21st-century Ethiopian people